Fredrik Larzon (born April 25, 1973) is the drummer of the Swedish punk band Millencolin. He was born and lives in Örebro, Sweden.
He runs another project named Kvoteringen.
Before joining Millencolin in 1993, Larzon was a member of the band Kung Pung. He replaced Mathias Färm on drums, who was better on guitar. His first recording with the band was their 1993 demo tape titled Melack. Larzon has the most interaction with fans as he is in charge of the Millencolin newsletter and responds to most of the fan mail. He is also an active member in some Millencolin fan forums. Larzon is a vegetarian.

References

1973 births
Living people
Swedish punk rock musicians
20th-century American drummers
American male drummers
21st-century American drummers
20th-century American male musicians
21st-century American male musicians